Wetmorella is a genus of wrasses native to the Indian and Pacific Oceans.

Species
The currently recognized species in this genus are:
 Wetmorella albofasciata L. P. Schultz & N. B. Marshall, 1954 (white-banded sharpnose wrasse)
 Wetmorella nigropinnata (Seale, 1901) (sharpnose wrasse)
 Wetmorella tanakai J. E. Randall & Kuiter, 2007 (Tanaka's wrasse)

References

Labridae
Marine fish genera
Taxa named by Henry Weed Fowler
Taxa named by Barton Appler Bean